Frederick Ansah Botchway (born 31 October 1996) is a Ghanaian professional footballer who plays as a midfielder for Ghanaian Premier league side Accra Hearts of Oak.

Club career

Liberty Professionals 
Botchway started his Ghana Premier League career with Dansoman side Liberty Professionals. Ahead of the 2015–16 season, he was promoted to the senior team. He made his professional debut on 1 June 2016 when he was brought on in the 80th minute during a 1–0 loss to Medeama SC. On 18 September 2016, he made his first start for the club and played the full 90 minutes in a 3–1 win over Bechem United. The following season, 2017 season, he became a key member of the side as he played 21 league matches and scored a goal. The goal was his debut league goal of which he scored on 8 October 2017 in a 4–2 victory over Berekum Chelsea. In 2018 season, Botchway played 7 out of the 15 league matches as the league was cancelled due to corruption scandal documentary Anas Number 12 exposé in relation to the Ghana Football Association. He played a major role in Liberty's 2019 GFA Special Competition campaign of which he played 13 out of 14 matches played and scored a goal to help Liberty place third, missing out on the Semi-final spot by two points. His performance during that campaign made him a transfer target for top teams including Asante Kotoko, Hearts of Oak and Legon Cities after his contract ended with Liberty. At the end of his 4–year stay with the club he played 43 league matches and scored 2 goals.

Hearts of Oak 
Botchway moved to Hearts of Oak on a free transfer in January 2020, two games after the start of the 2019–20 Ghana Premier League season. That week, he started his first match on 12 January 2020, in a 2–1 victory over Cape Coast Ebusua Dwarfs. He played 70 minutes of the match before being substituted for Dominic Eshun. In his second season with Hearts, Botchway played a major role in Hearts double winning season. He played 22 league matches and scored 2 goals as Hearts won the 2020–21 Ghana Premier League after a 12-year trophy drought. During the 2021 Ghanaian FA Cup final, he played 111 minutes of full time plus extra time before he was substituted for Emmanuel Nettey as Hearts won the match via a penalty shootout.

International career 
Botchway was called up to the Ghana A' national football team, the Local Black Stars ahead of their 2020 CHAN qualifiers and 2019 WAFU Cup of Nations, however he did not make the final squad.

Personal life 
Botchway considers former Ghanaian international captain Stephen Appiah who also featured for Accra Hearts of Oak as his idol and inspiration.

Honours 
Hearts of Oak

 Ghana Premier League: 2020–21
Ghanaian FA Cup: 2021, 2021–22

 Ghana Super Cup: 2021

 President's Cup: 2022

References

External links 

 

Living people
1996 births
Ghanaian footballers
Association football midfielders
Liberty Professionals F.C. players
Accra Hearts of Oak S.C. players
Ghana Premier League players
Charity Stars F.C. players